Michael Lvovitch Tsetlin (the surname is also written Cetlin, Tzetlin, Zeitlin, Zetlin; cyrillic: Михаил Львович Цетлин) (22 September 1924 – 30 May 1966) was a Soviet mathematician and physicist who worked on cybernetics. He introduced the Gelfand–Tsetlin basis for finite-dimensional representations of classical groups. He was the founder of the learning automaton approach to machine learning.

See also
 Gelfand–Tsetlin integrable system
 Boolean differential calculus
 Learning automaton
 Tsetlin machine

Collection of the publications 
Tsetlin M.L. Automation theory and modeling of biological systems. Academic Press; 1973.

References

 (In Russian)

External links
 ЦЕТЛИН Михаил Львович
 ЦЕТЛИН М.Л.

1924 births
1966 deaths
Soviet mathematicians